Seti was one of the fourteen zones located in the Far-Western Development Region of Nepal. Dhangadhi in the Terai is the major city of Seti Zone; headquarters are in Dipayal-Silgadhi. As of 2015, Nepal discontinued zone designations in favor of provinces; the area previously known as Seti Zone is now part of Sudurpashchim Province.

Administrative subdivisions
Seti was divided into five districts; since 2015 these districts have been redesignated as part of Sudurpashchim Province.

See also
 Development Regions of Nepal (Former)
 List of zones of Nepal (Former)
 List of districts of Nepal

 
Sudurpashchim Province
Zones of Nepal
2015 disestablishments in Nepal